Africanfuturism is a cultural aesthetic and philosophy of science that centers on the fusion of African culture, history, mythology, point of view, with technology based in Africa and not limiting to the diaspora. It was coined by Nigerian American writer Nnedi Okorafor in 2019 in a blog post as a single word. Nnedi Okorafor  defines Africanfuturism as a sub-category of science fiction that is "directly rooted in African culture, history, mythology and point-of-view..and...does not privilege or center the West," is centered with optimistic "visions in the future," and is written by (and centered on) "people of African descent" while rooted in the African continent. As such its center is African, often does extend upon the continent of Africa, and includes the Black diaspora, including fantasy that is set in the future, making a narrative "more science fiction than fantasy" and typically has mystical elements. It is different from Afrofuturism, which focuses mainly on the African diaspora, particularly the United States. Works of Africanfuturism include science fiction, fantasy, alternate history, horror and magic realism.

Writers of Africanfuturism include Nnedi Okorafor, Tochi Onyebuchi, Oghenechovwe Donald Ekpeki, Tade Thompson, Namwali Serpell, Sofia Samatar, Wole Talabi, Suyi Davies Okungbowa and Dandy Jackson Chukwudi.

History

Early beginnings 

Works of Africanfuturism have long existed and have been assigned to Afrofuturism. Themes of Africanfuturism can be traced back to Buchi Emecheta's 1983 novel The Rape Of Shavi and Ben Okri's 1991 novel The Famished Road.

21st century 

In 2019 and 2020, African writers began to reject the term Afrofuturism because of the differences between both genres with Africanfuturism focusing more on African point of view, culture, themes and history as opposed to Afrofuturism which covers African diaspora history, culture and themes. The speculative fiction magazine Omenana and the Nommo Awards presented by The African Speculative Fiction Society launched in 2017 helped to widen the content of the genre.

In August 2020, Hope Wabuke, a writer and assistant professor at the University of Nebraska-Lincoln of English and Creative Writing, noted that Afrofuturism, coined by Mark Dery, a White critic, in 1993, treats African-American themes and concerns in the "context of twentieth-century technoculture," which was later expanded by Alondra Nelson, arguing that Dery's conception of Blackness began in 1619 and "is marked solely by the ensuing 400 years of violation by whiteness" that he portrayed as "potentially irreparable." Critical of this definition, saying it lacks the qualities of the "Black American diasporic imagination" and ability to conceive of "Blackness outside of the Black American diaspora" or independent from Whiteness, she noted that "Africanfuturism" is different because it is, according to Nnedi Okorafor, more deeply rooted in "African culture, history, mythology and point-of-view as it then branches into the Black diaspora, and it does not privilege or center the West," while explaining Africanjujuism as a subcategory of fantasy. Wabuke further explains how Africanfuturism is more specific and rids itself of the "othering of the white gaze and the de facto colonial Western mindset," free from what she calls the "white Western gaze" and saying this is the main difference "between Afrofuturism and Africanfuturism." She adds that, in her view, Africanfuturism has a different outlook and perspective than "mainstream Western and American science fiction and fantasy" and even Afrofuturism which is "married to the white Western gaze." Wabuke goes on to explain Africanfuturist and Africanjujuist themes in Okorafor's Who Fears Death and Zahrah the Windseeker, Akwaeke Emezi's Pet, and Buchi Emecheta's The Rape of Shavi.

In February 2021, Aigner Loren Wilson of Tor.com explained the difficulty of finding books in the subgenre because many institutions "treat Africanfuturism and Afrofuturism like the same thing" even though the distinction between them is plain. She said that Africanfuturism is "centered in and about Africa and their people" while Afrofuturism is a sci-fi subcategory which is about "Black people within the diaspora," often including stories of those outside Africa, including in "colonized Western societies.". Another reviewer called Okorafor's Lagoon, which "recounts the story of the arrival of aliens in Nigeria," as an Africanfuturist work which requires a reader who is "actively engaged in co-creating the alternative future that the novel is constructing," meaning that the reader becomes part of the "creative conversation."

Literature and comics 
Africanfuturism literature features speculative fiction which narrates events centered on Africa from an African point of view rather than a Western point of view. Works of Africanfuturism literature are still wrongly categorized as Afrofuturism.

Works of Nigerian American writer Nnedi Okorafor are often in the Africanfuturism genre with her works like Who Fears Death, Lagoon, Remote Control, The Book of Phoenix and Noor. She won a Hugo and Nebula award for her novella Binti, the first from the Binti trilogy which features a native Himba girl from Namibia in space. Tade Thompson won a Arthur C. Clarke award for his Africanfuturist novel Rosewater about an alien dome in Nigeria and Zambian writer Namwali Serpell's The Old Drift won the same award.

In 2020, Africanfuturism: An Anthology edited by Wole Talabi was published by Brittle Paper and as of the end of 2022 is currently still offered for free on its website in celebration of the 10th anniversary of this publisher which has been called "the village square of African literature". Gary K. Wolfe reviewed this anthology in February 2021.  He credits Nnedi Okorafor for coining "Africanfuturism," noting its describes "more Africa-centered SF," although saying he is not sure whether her term "Africanjujuism," a parallel term for fantasy, will catch on. While saying that both are useful, he says that he does not like how they have to "do with the root, not the prefix," with "futurism" only describing a bit of science fiction and fantasy. He still calls the book a "solid anthology," saying it challenges the idea of viewing African science fiction as monolithic. Stories in the book include "Egoli" by T. L. Huchu, "Yat Madit" by Dilman Dila, "Behind Our Irises" by Tlotlo Tsamaase, "Fort Kwame" by Derek Lubangakene, "Rainmaker" by Mazi Nwonwu, "Fruit of the Calabash" by Rafeeat Aliyu, "Lekki Lekki" by Mame Bougouma Diene, and "Sunrise" by Nnedi Okorafor.

When Tor.com outlined a list of stories and books from the genre as of 2021, Tor also highlighted Africanfuturism: An Anthology (edited by Wole Talabi) along with the individual works of Namwali Serpell's The Old Drift, Nnedi Okorafor's Lagoon, Nicky Drayden's The Prey of Gods, Oghenechovwe Donald Ekpeki's Ife-Iyoku, the Tale of Imadeyunuagbon, and Tochi Onyebuchi's War Girls.

In comics, as of the end of 2022, so far a few Africanfuturism comics exist. Comic Republic Global Network, a Lagos-based publisher, is prominent in creating Africanfuturist superheroes like Guardian Prime. Laguardia, a comic book by Nnedi Okorafor, is associated with Africanfuturism.

In films 
Africanfuturism movies are often scarce; films like Black Panther have been criticized by some viewers, who say that their depiction of Africa "differs little from the colonial view". In recent times, Africanfuturist movies include Hello, Rain, Pumzi, and Ratnik. Several Africanfuturism novels have been optioned for live adaptation, including Binti and Who Fears Death. In 2020, Walt Disney Studios and Pan African company Kugali announced that they would be co-producing an africanfuturist animated science fiction series, Iwájú, inspired by the city of Lagos.

External links 

 University of Calabar, Nigeria's Ojima Sunday Nathaniel & Jonas Egbudu Akung's 2022 article "Afrofuturism and Africanfuturism: Black speculative writings in search of meaning and criteria" in Research Journal in Advanced Humanities preferentially supporting Okorafor's 'Africanfuturism' "because Dery’s". . ." inappropriate". . . "Afrofuturism is clearly an African-American signification that provides no space for the African imaginary", then their focus seeks more completion in "a  different  set  of  criteria  for  evaluation  and categorization of both concepts, and proposes five-point criteria—experience,  authorship,  language,  black  heroism  and  technology for their evaluation.".

 Tor 2021 Guide to Africanfuturism

 AfrikaIsWoke's 2021 article "The Difference Between African Futurism & Afrofuturism" which suggests that 'Black' is the perhaps the common general term comprising what have become narrowed in 'African' and 'Afro' when used as ethnic or racial terms, proceeding from Zambian queerist futurist author Masiyaleti Mbewe's distinction that "differences between African Futurism and Afrofuturism can best be understood as a natural byproduct of the fact that Africans in Africa, and Blacks in the diaspora have different life experiences that stem purely from the fact that they exist in different parts of the world."

 University of Kwazulu-Natal's Brett Taylor Banks' 2021 dissertation on "Okorafor’s Organic Fantasy: An Africanfuturist Approach to Science Fiction and Gender in Lagoon." by a European-African, reminding us that Africans now are not only Black, and Olive in the North, just as Americans have for half a millennium been not only Red but now Black, Yellow, White, and Brown, so geopolitical labels in the modern era of pervasive presumption of democracy's desirability deems interracial and genetic society politically correct. Overview page with abstract and link to downloadable copy of the actual dissertation. Notable, Banks "adapt[s] Francis Nyamnjoh’s convivial theory (2015) to estrange postmodernism from its western context, providing an African critical vocabulary".

 University of Ghana's black Nigerian-Finnish and Swedish Minna Salami's article "The Liquid Space where African Feminism and African Futurism Meet" in Feminist Africa, 2021, a journal of the Institute of African Studies and the University of Ghana, by this SOAS, University of London cross-cultural author who dubs herself a "Ms Afropolitan" and has received an Honorary Fellowship in Writing from The Hong Kong Baptist University.

 City College of New York's Damion Kareem Scott's 2021 chapter "Afrofuturism and Black Futurism: Some Ontological and Semantic Considerations" in Critical Black Futures, ed. P Butler.

 Africanfuturism: An Anthology edited by Wole Talabi, 2020, Brittle Paper, a defining collection of these newly named genres, has since October 2020 and is currently still offered for free on the publisher's website in celebration of the 10th anniversary of this publisher which has been called "the village square of African literature".

 Finnish Päivi Väätänen's 2019 'academic article' "Afro- versus Africanfuturism in Nnedi Okorafor’s 'The Magical Negro' and 'Mother of Invention'"

 Botswana-born York University's Pamela Phatsimo Sunstrum's 2013 article "Afro-mythology and African Futurism: The Politics of Imagining and Methodologies for Contemporary Creative Research Practices" in Paradoxa's special publication No. 25 – Africa SF, ed. Mark Bould of UWE Bristol, precursing current diction before 'African' and 'Futurism' were concatenated as an emergent term, though titles by her colleagues in this collection use, in 2013, Technofuture, Afrofuturism and AfroSF, and Bould's introduction uses Africa SF.

References 

Africanfuturism
2019 neologisms
Art movements
African culture
Science fiction genres
Pan-Africanism
Futurism by region
African literature